Saunemin Township is located in Livingston County, Illinois, United States. As of the 2010 census, its population was 666 and it contained 281 housing units. It is named after, and contains, Saunemin, Illinois.

Geography

Demographics

References

External links
US Census
City-data.com
Illinois State Archives

Townships in Livingston County, Illinois
Populated places established in 1857
Townships in Illinois
1857 establishments in Illinois